Wildcat Stadium is a 10,000-seat stadium in Fort Valley, Georgia, United States.  It is primarily used for American football, and is the home field of Fort Valley State University.  The stadium was built in 2008-2009, and renovated in 2021.  The home team at this stadium are the Fort Valley State Wildcats.

References

College football venues
Fort Valley State Wildcats football
American football venues in Georgia (U.S. state)
Buildings and structures in Peach County, Georgia